Suppanyu Avihingsanon (born 24 October 1989) is a Thai badminton player. He was the men's singles gold medalist at the 2011 Summer Universiade.

Achievements

Summer Universiade 
Men's singles

BWF World Tour (1 runner-up) 
The BWF World Tour, which was announced on 19 March 2017 and implemented in 2018, is a series of elite badminton tournaments sanctioned by the Badminton World Federation (BWF). The BWF World Tour is divided into levels of World Tour Finals, Super 1000, Super 750, Super 500, Super 300 (part of the HSBC World Tour), and the BWF Tour Super 100.

Men's singles

BWF Grand Prix (2 runners-up) 
The BWF Grand Prix had two levels, the Grand Prix and Grand Prix Gold. It was a series of badminton tournaments sanctioned by the Badminton World Federation (BWF) and played between 2007 and 2017.

Men's singles

  BWF Grand Prix Gold tournament
  BWF Grand Prix tournament

BWF International Challenge/Series (3 runners-up) 
Men's Singles

  BWF International Challenge tournament
  BWF International Series tournament
  BWF Future Series tournament

References

External links 
 

1995 births
Living people
Suppanyu Avihingsanon
Suppanyu Avihingsanon
Badminton players at the 2010 Asian Games
Badminton players at the 2014 Asian Games
Badminton players at the 2018 Asian Games
Suppanyu Avihingsanon
Asian Games medalists in badminton
Medalists at the 2010 Asian Games
Competitors at the 2011 Southeast Asian Games
Competitors at the 2013 Southeast Asian Games
Competitors at the 2015 Southeast Asian Games
Competitors at the 2017 Southeast Asian Games
Competitors at the 2019 Southeast Asian Games
Suppanyu Avihingsanon
Suppanyu Avihingsanon
Southeast Asian Games medalists in badminton
Suppanyu Avihingsanon
Suppanyu Avihingsanon
Universiade medalists in badminton
Medalists at the 2011 Summer Universiade
Medalists at the 2015 Summer Universiade
Suppanyu Avihingsanon